Colonnella  is a comune in the Province of Teramo  in the Italian region Abruzzo of eastern Italy.

Geography
The territory of Colonnella borders the following municipalities: Corropoli, Controguerra, Martinsicuro, Alba Adriatica, Monteprandone.

The territory of Colonnella is subdivided into nine districts: the "Centro capoluogo", Contrada Civita, Contrada Giardino, Contrada Riomoro, Contrada San Giovanni, Contrada San Martino, Contrada Sant'Angelo, Contrada Vallecupa, Contrada Vibrata and Contrada Isola.

References

Cities and towns in Abruzzo